The Anatomy Act 1832 (2 & 3 Will. IV c.75) is an Act of Parliament of the United Kingdom that gave free licence to doctors, teachers of anatomy and bona fide medical students to dissect donated bodies. It was enacted in response to public revulsion at the illegal trade in corpses.

Background

The 19th century ushered in a new-found medical interest in detailed anatomy thanks to an increase in the importance of surgery. In order to study anatomy, human cadavers were needed and thus ushered in the practice of grave robbing. Before 1832, the Murder Act 1752 stipulated that only the corpses of executed murderers could be used for dissection. By the early 19th century, the rise of medical science – coinciding with a reduction in the number of executions – had caused demand to outstrip supply.

Around 1810, an anatomical society was formed to impress upon the government the necessity for altering the law. Among its members were John Abernethy, Charles Bell, Everard Home, Benjamin Brodie, Astley Cooper, and Henry Cline. The efforts of this body gave rise in 1828 to a select committee to report on the question. The report of this committee led to the Bill. Public revulsion at the recent West Port murders swayed opinion in favour of a change in the law. In 1831 public outcry at the activities of the London Burkers caused further pressure for a Bill.

Passage of the Bill
Public sentiment notwithstanding, there was substantial opposition to the Bill.

In 1829 the Royal College of Surgeons petitioned against it, and it was withdrawn in the House of Lords owing to the opposition of the Archbishop of Canterbury William Howley.

A new Anatomy Bill was introduced in 1832. Though strongly opposed by Hunt, Sadler, and Vyvyan, it was supported by Macaulay and O'Connell. It was passed by the House of Lords on 19 July 1832.

Provisions of the Act
The Act provided that anyone intending to practise anatomy had to obtain a licence from the Home Secretary. Usually, one or two teachers in each institution took out this licence and hence were known as licensed teachers. They accepted responsibility for the proper treatment of all bodies dissected in the building for which their licence was granted.

Regulating these licensed teachers, and receiving constant reports from them, were four inspectors of anatomy, one each for London, the rest of England and Wales, Scotland, and Ireland, who reported to the Home Secretary, and knew the whereabouts of every body being dissected.

The principal provision of the Act was section 7, which stipulated that a person having lawful possession of a body could permit it to undergo "anatomical examination" (dissection) provided that no relative objected. Most of the other sections were subsidiary, detailing the methods for carrying section 7 into effect.

Also, section 16 repealed parts of sections 4 and 5 of the Offences Against the Person Act 1828, which had consolidated several provisions from several earlier statutes and had retained the provision of 1752 that the bodies of murderers were to be hung in chains or dissected after execution. Section 16 provided instead that such bodies were to be either hung in chains or buried within the precincts of the last prison in which the deceased had been confined. The provision for hanging in chains was repealed by the Hanging in Chains Act 1834, and the whole section was repealed and replaced by section 3 of the Offences against the Person Act 1861.

The Anatomy Act provided for the needs of physicians, surgeons, and students by giving them legal access to corpses that were unclaimed after death – in particular, corpses of those who had died in hospital, prison, or a workhouse.

Further, a person could donate the corpse of a next of kin in exchange for burial at the expense of the anatomy school. Occasionally a person, following the example of Jeremy Bentham, left their own body for dissection in the name of the advancement of science; but even then, if the person's relatives objected, it was not received.

Before the Act, anatomical research was difficult; for example, the anatomy of the nervous system was poorly understood.

The Act was effective in ending the practice of resurrectionists, who robbed graves as a means of obtaining corpses for medical study.

Mobs continued to protest against the Act into the 1840s, in the belief that it still failed to prevent the sale of paupers' bodies for medical research without their consent. An anatomical theatre in Cambridge was vandalised late in 1833 "by an angry mob determined to put a stop to the dissection of a man; this wave of popular protest alarmed the medical profession who resolved to hide its activities from the general public, and to a greater or lesser extent it has been doing so ever since".

Extent and repeals

Extent
The original extent was specified as Great Britain and Ireland. The Act (less any amendments) remains in force in Scotland and the Republic of Ireland.

Scotland 
The Act remains in force, with amendments, under the Human Tissue (Scotland) Act 2006; Scotland retains an Inspector of Anatomy.

Republic of Ireland 
The Act remains in the Irish Statute Book

Repeals

England and Wales 
The Act was repealed by the Anatomy Act 1984, which was in turn repealed by the Human Tissue Act 2004. Access to corpses for the purposes of medical science is now regulated by the Human Tissue Authority.

Northern Ireland 
The Act was repealed by the Anatomy (Northern Ireland) Order 1992, itself later repealed.

References

Bibliography

External links
 Original text of the Act, as enacted, from the Irish Statute Book
 Original text of the Act, as enacted, from the site of the Medical Council of Ireland
 The Anatomy Act of 1832, in the exhibition The Italian Boy and the unclaimed poor, King's College London
 Article from Modern Drug magazine
 The select committee enquiry of 1828, at University of Bristol
 Echoes of the Scottish Resurrection Men, from the site of the University of Aberdeen
 The Final Fate of the Poor — The Anatomy Act of 1832, from the site of Devon Heritage

Body snatching
United Kingdom Acts of Parliament 1832
1832 in science
Repealed United Kingdom Acts of Parliament
Medical education in the United Kingdom
Acts of the Parliament of the United Kingdom concerning healthcare
Acts of the Parliament of the United Kingdom concerning Ireland